Elisa Samuel Macundo Cossa (born 3 June 1980) is a retired Mozambican athlete who competed mostly in the sprinting events and the long jump. Her biggest success is the silver medal in the long jump at the 2000 African Championships.

She is Mozambican record holder in the 100 metres and the long jump.

Competition record

Personal bests
100 metres – 11.61 (+0.7 m/s) (Girona 2000) NR
200 metres – 24.21 (+0.1 m/s) (Réduit 2002)
400 metres – 54.09 (Algiers 2007)
800 metres – 2:09.47 (Madrid 2008)
Long jump – 6.40 (+0.2 m/s) (Pretoria 2000) NR

References

1980 births
Living people
Mozambican female middle-distance runners
Mozambican female sprinters
Athletes (track and field) at the 1998 Commonwealth Games
Athletes (track and field) at the 2002 Commonwealth Games
Athletes (track and field) at the 2010 Commonwealth Games
Commonwealth Games competitors for Mozambique
Female long jumpers
Mozambican long jumpers
African Games competitors for Mozambique
Athletes (track and field) at the 1999 All-Africa Games
Athletes (track and field) at the 2003 All-Africa Games
Athletes (track and field) at the 2007 All-Africa Games
Athletes (track and field) at the 2011 All-Africa Games